The 2011 Qatar motorcycle Grand Prix was the opening round of the 2011 MotoGP championship. It took place on the weekend of 17–20 March 2011 at the Losail International Circuit located in Doha, Qatar.
In the MotoGP race Casey Stoner won finishing 3.44 seconds ahead of 2010 world champion Jorge Lorenzo with Dani Pedrosa in third place.

MotoGP classification

Moto2 classification

125 cc classification

Championship standings after the race (MotoGP)
Below are the standings for the top five riders and constructors after round one has concluded.

Riders' Championship standings

Constructors' Championship standings

 Note: Only the top five positions are included for both sets of standings.

References

Qatar motorcycle Grand Prix
Qatar
Motorcycle Grand Prix